Hypselodoris brycei is a species of sea slug or dorid nudibranch, a marine gastropod mollusc in the family Chromodorididae.

Distribution
This nudibranch was described from Epsilon Island, Montebello Islands, Western Australia, . It is known only from the Houtman Abrolhos Islands to the Exmouth Region and Dampier Archipelago, Western Australia.

Description
Hypselodoris brycei has a translucent white body with a deep violet marginal band and paler violet pigment all over the mantle. The gills and rhinophores are red to orange with a purple base. There is a purple band around the edge of the foot.

This species can reach a total length of at least 50 mm.

References

Chromodorididae
Gastropods described in 2018